In geology, hotspots (or hot spots) are volcanic locales thought to be fed by underlying mantle that is anomalously hot compared with the surrounding mantle. Examples include the Hawaii, Iceland, and Yellowstone hotspots. A hotspot's position on the Earth's surface is independent of tectonic plate boundaries, and so hotspots may create a chain of volcanoes as the plates move above them.

There are two hypotheses that attempt to explain their origins. One suggests that hotspots are due to mantle plumes that rise as thermal diapirs from the core–mantle boundary. The alternative plate theory is that the mantle source beneath a hotspot is not anomalously hot, rather the crust above is unusually weak or thin, so that lithospheric extension permits the passive rising of melt from shallow depths.

Origin

The origins of the concept of hotspots lie in the work of J. Tuzo Wilson, who postulated in 1963 that the formation of the Hawaiian Islands resulted from the slow movement of a tectonic plate across a hot region beneath the surface. It was later postulated that hotspots are fed by narrow streams of hot mantle rising from the Earth's core–mantle boundary in a structure called a mantle plume.  Whether or not such mantle plumes exist is the subject of a major controversy in Earth science.

At any place where volcanism is not linked to a constructive or destructive plate margin, the concept of a hotspot has been used to explain its origin. In a review article by Courtillot et al. listing possible hotspots, distinction is made between primary hotspots coming from deep within the mantle (possibly originating from the core/mantle boundary), creating large volcanic provinces with linear tracks (Easter Island, Iceland, Hawaii, Afar, Louisville, Reunion, Tristan confirmed, Galapagos, Kerguelen and Marquersas likely) and secondary hotspots derived from mantle plumes (Samoa, Tahiti, Cook, Pitcairn, Caroline, MacDonald confirmed, up to about 20 possible) at the upper/lower mantle boundary that do not form large volcanic provinces but form island chains. Other potential hotspots are the result of shallow mantle material surfacing in areas of lithospheric break-up caused by tension (and are thus a very different type of volcanism).  
 
Estimates for the number of hotspots postulated to be fed by mantle plumes have ranged from about 20 to several thousand, with most geologists considering a few tens to exist. Hawaii, Réunion, Yellowstone, Galápagos, and Iceland are some of the most active volcanic regions to which the hypothesis is applied.

Composition
Most hotspot volcanoes are basaltic (e.g., Hawaii, Tahiti). As a result, they are less explosive than subduction zone volcanoes, in which water is trapped under the overriding plate. Where hotspots occur in continental regions, basaltic magma rises through the continental crust, which melts to form rhyolites. These rhyolites can form violent eruptions. For example, the Yellowstone Caldera was formed by some of the most powerful volcanic explosions in geologic history. However, when the rhyolite is completely erupted, it may be followed by eruptions of basaltic magma rising through the same lithospheric fissures (cracks in the lithosphere). An example of this activity is the Ilgachuz Range in British Columbia, which was created by an early complex series of trachyte and rhyolite eruptions, and late extrusion of a sequence of basaltic lava flows.

The hotspot hypothesis is now closely linked to the mantle plume hypothesis.

Contrast with subduction zone island arcs 
Hotspot volcanoes are considered to have a fundamentally different origin from island arc volcanoes. The latter form over subduction zones, at converging plate boundaries.  When one oceanic plate meets another, the denser plate is forced downward into a deep ocean trench. This plate, as it is subducted, releases water into the base of the over-riding plate, and this water mixes with the rock, thus changing its composition causing some rock to melt and rise. It is this that fuels a chain of volcanoes, such as the Aleutian Islands, near Alaska.

Hotspot volcanic chains

The joint mantle plume/hotspot hypothesis envisages the feeder structures to be fixed relative to one another, with the continents and seafloor drifting overhead. The hypothesis thus predicts that time-progressive chains of volcanoes are developed on the surface. Examples are Yellowstone, which lies at the end of a chain of extinct calderas, which become progressively older to the west. Another example is the Hawaiian archipelago, where islands become progressively older and more deeply eroded to the northwest.

Geologists have tried to use hotspot volcanic chains to track the movement of the Earth's tectonic plates. This effort has been vexed by the lack of very long chains, by the fact that many are not time-progressive (e.g. the Galápagos) and by the fact that hotspots do not appear to be fixed relative to one another (e.g. Hawaii and Iceland).

In 2020, Wei et al. used seismic tomography to detect the oceanic plateau, formed about 100 million years ago by the hypothesized mantle plume head of the Hawaii-Emperor seamount chain, now subducted to a depth of 800 km under eastern Siberia.

Postulated hotspot volcano chains

 Hawaiian–Emperor seamount chain (Hawaii hotspot)
 Louisville Ridge (Louisville hotspot)
 Walvis Ridge (Gough and Tristan hotspot)
 Kodiak–Bowie Seamount chain (Bowie hotspot)
 Cobb–Eickelberg Seamount chain (Cobb hotspot)
 New England Seamounts (New England hotspot)
 Anahim Volcanic Belt (Anahim hotspot)
 Mackenzie dike swarm (Mackenzie hotspot)
 Great Meteor hotspot track (New England hotspot)
 St. Helena Seamount Chain–Cameroon Volcanic Line (Saint Helena hotspot)
 Southern Mascarene Plateau–Chagos-Maldives-Laccadive Ridge (Réunion hotspot)
 Ninety East Ridge (Kerguelen hotspot)
 Tuamotu–Line Island chain (Easter hotspot)
 Austral–Gilbert–Marshall chain (Macdonald hotspot)
 Juan Fernández Ridge (Juan Fernández hotspot)
 Tasmantid Seamount Chain (Tasmantid hotspot)
 Canary Islands (Canary hotspot)
 Cape Verde (Cape Verde hotspot)

List of volcanic regions postulated to be hotspots

Eurasian Plate
 Eifel hotspot (8)
 , w= 1 az= 082° ±8° rate= 12 ±2 mm/yr
 Iceland hotspot (14)
  
 Eurasian Plate, w= .8 az= 075° ±10° rate= 5 ±3 mm/yr
 North American Plate, w= .8 az= 287° ±10° rate= 15 ±5 mm/yr
 Possibly related to the North Atlantic continental rifting (62 Ma), Greenland.
 Azores hotspot (1)
  
 Eurasian Plate, w= .5 az= 110° ±12°
 North American Plate, w= .3 az= 280° ±15°
 Jan Mayen hotspot (15)
  
 Hainan hotspot (46)
 , az= 000° ±15°

African Plate
 Mount Etna (47)
  
 Hoggar hotspot (13)
 , w= .3 az= 046° ±12° 
 Tibesti hotspot (40)
 , w= .2 az= 030° ±15° 
 Jebel Marra/Darfur hotspot (6)
 , w= .5 az= 045° ±8° 
 Afar hotspot (29, misplaced in map)
 , w= .2 az= 030° ±15° rate= 16 ±8 mm/yr 
 Possibly related to the Afar Triple Junction, 30 Ma.
 Cameroon hotspot (17)
 , w= .3 az= 032° ±3° rate= 15 ±5 mm/yr 
 Madeira hotspot (48)
 , w= .3 az= 055° ±15° rate= 8 ±3 mm/yr 
 Canary hotspot (18)
 , w= 1 az= 094° ±8° rate= 20 ±4 mm/yr 
 New England/Great Meteor hotspot (28)
 , w= .8 az= 040° ±10° 
 Cape Verde hotspot (19)
 , w= .2 az= 060° ±30° 
 Sierra Leone hotspot
 St. Helena hotspot (34)
 , w= 1 az= 078° ±5° rate= 20 ±3 mm/yr 
 Gough hotspot (49), at 40°19' S 9°56' W.
 , w= .8 az= 079° ±5° rate= 18 ±3 mm/yr 
 Tristan hotspot (42), at 37°07′ S 12°17′ W.
  
 Vema hotspot (Vema Seamount, 43), at 31°38' S 8°20' E.
  
 Related maybe to the Paraná and Etendeka traps (c. 132 Ma) through the Walvis Ridge.
 Discovery hotspot (50) (Discovery Seamounts)
 , w= 1 az= 068° ±3° 
 Bouvet hotspot (51)
  
 Shona/Meteor hotspot (27)
 , w= .3 az= 074° ±6° 
 Réunion hotspot (33)
 , w= .8 az= 047° ±10° rate= 40 ±10 mm/yr 
 Possibly related to the Deccan Traps (main events: 68.5–66 Ma)
 Comoros hotspot (21)
 , w= .5 az=118 ±10° rate=35 ±10 mm/yr

Antarctic Plate
 Marion hotspot (25)
 , w= .5 az= 080° ±12° 
 Crozet hotspot (52)
 , w= .8 az= 109° ±10° rate= 25 ±13 mm/yr 
 Possibly related to the Karoo-Ferrar geologic province (183 Ma)
 Kerguelen hotspot (20)
 , w= .2 az= 050° ±30° rate= 3 ±1 mm/yr 
 Île Saint-Paul and Île Amsterdam could be part of the Kerguelen hotspot trail (St. Paul is probably not another hotspot)
 Related maybe to the Kerguelen Plateau (130 Ma)
 Heard hotspot (53)
 , w= .2 az= 030° ±20° 
 Balleny hotspot (2)
 , w= .2 az= 325° ±7° 
 Erebus hotspot (54)

South American Plate
 Trindade/Martin Vaz hotspot (41)
 , w= 1 az= 264° ±5° 
 Fernando hotspot (9)
 , w= 1 az= 266° ±7° 
 Possibly related to the Central Atlantic Magmatic Province (c. 200 Ma)
 Ascension hotspot (55)

North American Plate
 Bermuda hotspot (56)
 , w= .3 az= 260° ±15° 
 Yellowstone hotspot (44)
 , w= .8 az= 235° ±5° rate= 26 ±5 mm/yr 
 Possibly related to the Columbia River Basalt Group (17–14 Ma).
 Raton hotspot (32)
 , w= 1 az= 240°±4° rate= 30 ±20 mm/yr 
 Anahim hotspot (45)
  (Nazko Cone)

Australian Plate
 Lord Howe hotspot (22)
 , w= .8 az= 351° ±10° 
 Tasmantid hotspot (39)
 , w= .8 az= 007° ±5° rate= 63 ±5 mm/yr 
 East Australia hotspot (30)
 , w= .3 az= 000° ±15° rate= 65 ±3 mm/yr

Nazca Plate
 Juan Fernández hotspot (16)
 , w= 1 az= 084° ±3° rate= 80 ±20 mm/yr 
 San Felix hotspot (36)
 , w= .3 az= 083° ±8° 
 Easter hotspot (7)
 , w= 1 az= 087° ±3° rate= 95 ±5 mm/yr 
 Galápagos hotspot (10)
  
 Nazca Plate, w= 1 az= 096° ±5° rate= 55 ±8 mm/yr
 Cocos Plate, w= .5 az= 045° ±6°
 Possibly related to the Caribbean large igneous province (main events: 95–88 Ma).

Pacific Plate

 Louisville hotspot (23)
 , w= 1 az= 316° ±5° rate= 67 ±5 mm/yr 
 Possibly related to the Ontong Java Plateau (125–120 Ma).
 Foundation hotspot/Ngatemato seamounts (57)
 , w= 1 az= 292° ±3° rate= 80 ±6 mm/yr 
 Macdonald hotspot (24)
 , w= 1 az= 289° ±6° rate= 105 ±10 mm/yr 
 North Austral/President Thiers (President Thiers Bank, 58)
 , w= (1.0) azim= 293° ± 3° rate= 75 ±15 mm/yr 
 Arago hotspot (Arago Seamount, 59)
 , w= 1 azim= 296° ±4° rate= 120 ±20 mm/yr 
 Maria/Southern Cook hotspot (Îles Maria, 60)
 , w= 0.8 az= 300° ±4° 
 Samoa hotspot (35)
 , w= .8 az= 285°±5° rate= 95 ±20 mm/yr 
 Crough hotspot (Crough Seamount, 61)
 , w= .8 az= 284° ± 2° 
 Pitcairn hotspot (31)
 , w= 1 az= 293° ±3° rate= 90 ±15 mm/yr 
 Society/Tahiti hotspot (38)
 , w= .8 az= 295°±5° rate= 109 ±10 mm/yr 
 Marquesas hotspot (26)
 , w= .5 az= 319° ±8° rate= 93 ±7 mm/yr 
 Caroline hotspot (4)
 , w= 1 az= 289° ±4° rate= 135 ±20 mm/yr 
 Hawaii hotspot (12)
 , w= 1 az= 304° ±3° rate= 92 ±3 mm/yr 
 Socorro/Revillagigedos hotspot (37)
  
 Guadalupe hotspot (11)
 , w= .8 az= 292° ±5° rate= 80 ±10 mm/yr 
 Cobb hotspot (5)
 , w= 1 az= 321° ±5° rate= 43 ±3 mm/yr 
 Bowie/Pratt-Welker hotspot (3)
 , w=.8 az= 306° ±4° rate= 40 ±20 mm/yr

Former hotspots
 Euterpe/Musicians hotspot (Musicians Seamounts) 
 Mackenzie hotspot
 Matachewan hotspot

See also

 Anorogenic magmatism
 Cold spot
 Tharsis

References

Further reading

External links

 Formation of Hotspots
 Raising Hot Spots
 Large Igneous Provinces (LIPs)
 Maria Antretter, PhD Thesis (2001): Moving hotspots – Evidence from paleomagnetism and modeling
 Do Plumes Exist?

 
Plate tectonics
Volcanology

Structure of the Earth